Mukwoorʉ (based on Comanche mukua "spirit") (Spirit Talker) (d. March 19, 1840) was a 19th-century Penateka Comanche Chief and medicine man in Central Texas. His nephews were the two cousins Buffalo Hump and Yellow Wolf, both very important Penateka war chiefs during the 1840s and 1850s.

Peace council
An important leader since the beginning of the 1820s, was chief and shaman; as their uncle, he trained the two cousins Buffalo Hump and Yellow Wolf, the most important war chiefs of the Penateka Comanches in the period between the Texas Independence and the Civil War; in 1829 he and Yncoroy tried to reach a peace agreement with the Mexican authorities, but a raid against the settlements in the Guadalupe valley led by Buffalo Hump and Yellow Wolf provoked the failure of this project; in 1838 he went to Houston, where he, Amorous Man, Old Owl, and Buffalo Hump met President Sam Houston and signed with him a treaty, while Yellow Wolf stayed in charge of the warriors. His village along the San Saba River was attacked in February 1839 by a detachment of Texas Rangers and their Tonkawa and Lipan auxiliaries, led by Col. John H. Moore.  Most of the casualties were women and children. Mukwooru was the Comanche Chief who was chosen to represent the Penateka and Comanche in 1840. They had agreed to gather in San Antonio, Texas to try to make peace with the Texans. However, he was killed during the meeting in the Council House Fight.

Sources
 Wallace, Ernest & Hoebel, E. Adamson. The Comanche: Lords of the Southern Plains, University of Oklahoma Press, Norman, 1952
 Schilz, Jodye Lynn Dickson andThomas F.Schilz. Buffalo Hump and the Penateka Comanches, Texas Western Press, El Paso, 1989
 Nye, Wilbur Sturtevant. Carbine and Lance: The Story of Old Fort Sill, University of Oklahoma Press, Norman, 1983
 Leckie, William H. The Buffalo Soldiers: A Narrative of the Negro Cavalry in the West, University of Oklahoma Press, Norman, 1967
 Fowler, Arlen L. The Black Infantry in the West, 1869-1891, University of Oklahoma Press, Norman, 1996
 Brown, Dee. Bury My Heart at Wounded Knee: An Indian History of the American West, Holt, Rinehart & Winston, New York, 1970

References

Year of birth missing
1840 deaths
Comanche people
Texas–Indian Wars
Native American people of the Indian Wars
Battles involving the Comanche
Native American leaders